Al-Muhannad 'ala al-Mufannad, also known as al-Tasdiqat li-Daf' al-Talbisat, was subsequently published in Urdu as 'Aqa'id 'Ulama' Ahl al-Sunna Deoband (The Beliefs of the Sunni Scholars of Deoband) is a book that expresses some of the beliefs held by the Sunni Hanafi Deobandis. It was authored by the Indian Hanafi-Maturidi hadith scholar and Sufi master Khalil Ahmad al-Saharanpuri in 1907, who wrote a commentary on Sunan Abi Dawud, entitled Badhl al-Majhud.

The book is not an independent book on creed, but rather a compilation of questions and answers which were asked by the Arab scholars at that time. These questions were sent to the Deobandi scholars by Husain Ahmad al-Madani, who was living in Medina, so Saharanpuri responded and answered them, and then these questions and answers were compiled into a book and were printed under the name of al-Muhannad 'ala al-Mufannad. Since most of these questions were related to beliefs, and in the correct jargon, were related to the branches which pertain to beliefs and the science of Kalam, it became published under the title of Mabahith fi 'Aqa'id Ahl al-Sunna.

Summary 
The text succinctly summarizes Deobandi perspectives on a range of controversial issues, such as: the ruling on Wahhabis, the ruling on celebrating Prophet Muhammad's birth (al-Mawlid al-Nabawi), whether the Deobandis believe it commendable to visit the Prophet Muhammad's grave (they do, according to Saharanpuri), whether intercession (tawassul) through the Prophet or saints is permissible (it is, so long as one understands the power to intercede comes from God), whether the Prophet is living in his grave (he is), whether it is permissible to send salutations to the Prophet (it is), whether any part of creation is better than the Prophet (it is not), whether the Prophet is the seal of the Prophets (he is), and the possibility of the occurrence of lying or reneging on a promise, among other topics and issues that were raised by various sects of Islam towards Deobandi scholars.

Publication history 
According to Muhammad ibn Adam al-Kawthari, the book first appeared in the 1325 Hijri year.

Revised Arabic edition 
The edited version of Al-Muhannad ala al-Mufannad by Muhammad ibn Adam al-Kawthari, entitled Mabahith fi Aqa’id Ahl al-Sunna al-Musamma al- Muhannad ala al-Mufannad was first published in Arabic in 2004 in Amman (Jordon) by Dar al-Fath for Research and Publishing and copies of it are available in bookshops in many Arab counties such as Syria, Jordon, UAE, Yemen and Egypt.

Urdu edition

Pashto edition 
The book was translated into Pashto by Habib al-Rahman Habibi.

Persian edition 
The book was translated into Persian by Abd al-Rahman Sarbazi, an Iranian Sunni Hanafi scholar, and published in 2015 in Mashhad.

Quotes 
Here are some quotations from the book:

Methodological principles

Ruling on Wahhabism

Issue of the possibility of lying

Reception 
The book has been described by Muhammad Ali Jalandhari (1895–1971) as “the ‘official spokesperson’ (sarkari tarjuman) for the maslak (track) of Deoband, to accept which is to be Deobandi, and to deviate from which is to depart from the maslak of Deoband.”

Qadi Mazhar Husayn (1914–2004) said: “Al-Muhannad is, as it were, a unanimous historical document of the senior scholars (akabir) of Deoband that has preserved the maslak of Deoband in terms of its principles.”

Muhammad Yusuf Ludhianvi (1932–2000) said, as mentioned in Fatawa Bayyinat:

See also 
 Fitnat al-Wahhabiyya
 Fada'il al-A'mal
 Revival from Below: The Deoband Movement and Global Islam

References

External links 
 Download in English
 Download in Arabic
 Download in Urdu
 Download in Urdu
 Download in Pashto
 Download in Persian
 

Kalam
Maturidi literature
Sunni literature
Sufi literature
Islamic theology books
Books about Wahhabism
Deobandi literature
1907 books
20th-century Indian books